The Battle of Karanovasa (lit. "Battle of the Trenches") took place on 10 October 1394 between the Wallachian army led by Voivode Mircea cel Bătrân against an Ottoman invasion led by Sultan Bayezid I. This battle is sometimes confused with the later Battle of Rovine (lit. "Battle of the Marshes", Rovine is old Romanian-Latin for ruins, modern Italian rovinare to tear down) between the same combatants, and which took place also along the valley of the Argeş River.

Background
The Ottoman Empire emerged as a small principality in the early fourteenth century in the northwestern part of the Anatolian Peninsula. In the following decades, the Ottoman sultans combined their growing military strength with astute dynastic politics to expand their territory eastwards into the whole of Anatolia and westwards into the Balkan Peninsula. Thus, in 1387 Murad I (1362–89) conquered much of Greece and fought a large Christian army at the Battle of Kosovo in 1389. In the early 1390s his successor Bayezid I (1389–1402) established his suzerainty over Stefan Lazarević of Serbia, the Turnovo Bulgaria of Ivan Shishman, and the Vidin Despotate of Ivan Sratsimir. The Ottoman Empire had become one of the most important powers in the Balkans, threatening the remaining independent states of central Europe: Wallachia, Moldavia, the Kingdom of Hungary, as well as the Venetian colonies in the Aegean Sea. Mircea of Wallachia previously secured an alliance with several Karamanid princes of Anatolia, which antagonized Bayezid I. Yet Bayezid despite defeating the Karamanids, had to plan and act every action carefully, since he had more enemies than friends among the Muslim Turkish aristocracy, and could not simply turn around and declare a new "holy war" against those whose troops helped the Karamanid princes in Anatolia. His opportunity came when the Wallachians and the Hungarians invaded the weak states from the south of the Danube, which were vassals of Bayezid. The Wallachians occupied the Principality of Karvuna and the city of Silistra apparently with the consent of Ivan Shishman, while the Hungarians tried to conquer the Vidin Despotate. These infringements on his vassals' lands gave Bayezid authority to move.

Returning from Asia Minor to the Balkans in 1393, the Sultan expelled the Wallachians from Silistra and the Dobruja, and declared that Turnovo Tsardom, unable to fend for herself, was now an Ottoman pashalik. The final attack on Wallachia was to take place.

The battle
In the autumn of 1394, after a raiding campaign along the right bank of the Danube, Bayezid launched the attack on Wallachia. He commanded the Ottoman Rumelian army, and the armies of his Balkan vassals, most of which were Bulgarians and Serbs under Stefan Lazarević, the son of the late Serbian prince Lazar. The armies crossed the Danube at Nicopolis, and advanced along the Argeş River with the intention of capturing Curtea de Argeş, the capital city of Wallachia. After a weeklong march in which the constant Wallachian attacks took their toll, the Wallachian army met the Ottomans on October 10. The Wallachians launched a sudden ambush from the forests, slowly pushing the Ottomans closer to the bank of the Argeş River. The bloodiest fighting took place around the Ottoman camp, strengthened with earth walls, palisades, and ditches (hendek in Turkish). Hence, the name with which this battle appears in Serbian chronicles, as the Battle of the Trenches (of Karanovasa). Surrounded, the Ottomans managed to resist until dawn, when Bayiezid barely managed to escape the battle, fleeing over the Danube Nevertheless, most of his and his vassals’ armies perished.

Aftermath
It would turn out that his vassals suffered more from the Sultans "help" than they did from the Wallachians and Hungarians. The Turnovo Tsardom not only ceased its existence, but Ivan Shishman was accused of collaboration with the enemy and was executed at the orders of the Sultan. Bayezid spent the winter and the spring warring in Anatolia with Seljuk princes, besieging Constantinople, and leaving the lands south of the Danube in the hands of Mircea, who by now managed to provoke an anti-Ottoman rebellion as far south as Rumelia.

A much better prepared attack, in which the entire Ottoman army, as well as the whole of the Ottoman vassals took part, was started by the Sultan in spring, in May 1395. The alliance documents signed at Brașov on March 7, between Mircea and Sigismund of Luxembourg, reveal that by 1395, a huge concentration of Ottoman forces took place in the southern Dobruja. The Ottoman army launched a two-pronged attack via Nicopolis, and Vidin-Craiova. Another Ottoman army group, led by Vlad I of Wallachia, Mircea's nephew, who was attempting to take the throne with Turkish support, was invading along the Ialomiţa River. Faced with a much larger force, Mircea applied guerrilla tactics, and delayed direct confrontation with the Ottoman army until he received help from his ally Sigismund. The final confrontation would take place at the Battle of Rovine (lit. "Battle of the Marshes").

References

Mircea Dogaru: Un principe intre crestini, in  "Lumea Magazin", nr.1, 2003. 
Peter Sugar: The Early History and the Establishment of the Ottomans in Europe, in "Southeastern Europe Under Ottoman Rule, 1354–1804". U of Washington Press 1977; Chapter I: 

1394 in Europe
Conflicts in 1394
Battles involving the Ottoman Empire
Battles involving Serbia
Battles involving Wallachia
14th century in Serbia
1394 in the Ottoman Empire